Haplochromis vittatus is a species of cichlid endemic to Lake Kivu in East Africa.  This species reaches a length of  SL.

References

vittatus
Fish described in 1901
Taxonomy articles created by Polbot